This is a list of German language place names in Bohemia, now exonyms for towns and villages in the Karlovy Vary Region of the Czech Republic.

Aš Asch
Bečov nad Teplou Petschau
Březová Prösau
Cheb Eger
Chodov Chodau
Františkovy Lázně Franzensbad
Habartov Haberspirk
Horní Slavkov Schlaggenwald
Hranice Roßbach
Hrozňatov Altkinsberg (until 1946 Kynšperk) 
Jáchymov Joachimsthal
Karlovy Vary Karlsbad
Kraslice Graslitz
Kynšperk nad Ohří Königsberg a.d. Eger
Lázně Kynžvart Bad Königswart
Loket Ellbogen
Luby Schönbach
Mariánské Lázně Marienbad
Nejdek Neudeck
Nová Role Neu Rohlau
Nové Sedlo Neusattl
Ostrov Schlackenwerth
Plesná Fleißen
Rotava Rothau
Skalná Wildstein
Sokolov Falkenau
Teplá Stadt Tepl
Toužim Theusing
Valeč Waltsch
Žlutice Luditz

Karlovy Vary
Karlovy Vary Region
Names of places in the Czech Republic